Little River is a  river in Tennessee which drains a  area containing some of the most spectacular scenery in the southeastern United States.  The first  of the river are all located within the borders of the Great Smoky Mountains National Park.  The remaining  flow out of the mountains through Blount County to join the Tennessee River at Fort Loudon Lake in Knox County.

History, Course & Geology

Source to Elkmont

Little River rises in Sevier County inside the national park on the north slope of Clingmans Dome, the highest point in Tennessee.  Clingmans Dome is located directly on the Tennessee-North Carolina state line, which parallels the Appalachian Trail along the crest of the Smokies.  Approximately one mile below its source, Little River absorbs several smaller streams at an area known as "Three Forks", where the river gains considerable strength.  From here, the river is paralleled by the well-maintained Little River Trail which leads into Elkmont. Located in a valley created by Little River's confluence with Jakes Creek, Elkmont was originally a logging camp for the Little River Lumber Company and a station on the Little River Railroad. In the 1920s a series of cabins and inholdings, including the Wonderland Hotel, were leased to private citizens.  The leases remained intact until 2001, when the last lease expired.

The road improves at Elkmont to become one which is easily suitable for most vehicles.  This section of the river is navigable by expert kayak and canoe enthusiasts and offers excellent fishing for native brook trout.

Elkmont to the Townsend Y

From just below Elkmont, the Little River runs parallel to State Route 73, also known as Little River Gorge Road, which connects the two major Tennessee entrances to the Great Smoky Mountains National Park: those in Gatlinburg and Townsend.  The stream, like the road that follows it, is quite sinuous. The road is built on the bed of the Little River Railroad that was used for logging purposes prior to the establishment of the park.

Along the course of Little River are several small waterfalls which feed into the river, which are especially strong during wet weather.  One waterfall, Meigs Falls, is visible from the road and is provided with a parking turnout. Additionally, there are parking turnouts for trails leading to numerous places.  About midway between Gatlinburg and Townsend, Little River enters a relatively flat area known as Metcalf Bottoms, which developed along an oasis of soft phyllite amidst the more predominant sandstone.  The park service has established a picnic area  at Metcalf Bottoms, providing an attractive area for summer picnics and wading.

Just past Metcalf Bottoms, Little River becomes more rapid and volatile as it slices through Little River Gorge, a narrow valley between Round Top Mountain and Curry She Mountain.  Among the gorge's more notable landmarks is an area known as "The Sinks."  The Sinks is where the river flows over a ten-foot (three meters) waterfall into a large pool, and then seems to disappear for a small distance. (Unlike streams in a limestone area, which may actually "sink" for a considerable distance, this is more a question of appearance than of the stream truly "sinking", which is not feasible in this area of ancient Precambrian metamorphic rock.)  Below the Sinks, Little River is navigable in high water with a canoe or kayak.

Continuing to follow TN 73 the stream crosses into Blount County en route to its confluence with Middle Prong of Little River at an area known as the "Townsend Y".

The Middle Prong

The Middle Prong of Little River drains the watershed between Miry Ridge and Defeat Ridge, both of which descend from the crest of the Smokies. The Middle Prong is formed by the confluence of Lynn Camp Prong and Thunderhead Prong at the former logging town of Tremont, where it has cut a deep gorge.  From here, the river continues northward, absorbing Spruce Flats Branch and several smaller streams before steadying in a relatively flat area known as Walker Valley.  The Middle Prong is shadowed by the old roadbed of the Little River Railroad for almost all of its nine-mile (14 km) length.

Laurel Creek, which drains the White Oak Sink area, joins the West Prong, which drains the area beneath Spence Field. The West Prong then joins the Middle Prong a mile east of the Townsend Wye at the junction of Tremont Road and Laurel Creek Road.

Only the stream below the Great Smoky Mountains Institute at Tremont is navigable by kayak in high water.  Fishing along Middle Prong is considered excellent.

Townsend Wye to Walland

The Townsend 'Y' is created by the confluence of Little River (flowing from the east) and Middle Prong of Little River (flowing from the west), which create a powerful stream that flows north.  The Townsend Y is a popular swimming hole in the summer and is generally packed with cars and people. Many tubers use the Y as the jumping off point for a mile long float down the river. Just past the Y, Little River exits the Great Smoky Mountains National Park into Tuckaleechee Cove and Townsend. From this point forward, with the exception of two old mill dams, the Little River can be navigated in a kayak at normal water levels. Tubers typically travel from the Townsend Y to the vicinity of the first mill dam (above the Highway 321 bridge). This portion of the river has intermittent rapids and swimming areas, as well as large rocks in the middle of the river (such as Gallaher Rock near Cedar Bluff Way) that are suitable to rest at.

In Townsend, the river is paralleled by U.S. Highway 321. Townsend is situated in Tuckaleechee Cove, a Paleozoic limestone area noted by the presence of Tuckaleechee Caverns, a large cave operated as a tourist attraction during the tourist season, roughly defined as April to October.  The drainage from the cave enters the Little River just below Townsend.

Townsend is laid out in the cove along the Little River valley.  Three decades ago it was largely undeveloped, with a few small "mom and pop" style hotels and restaurants; now major chains have built larger lodging facilities, although not yet comparable to Gatlinburg or Pigeon Forge.  Of interest are the Little River Railroad and Lumber Company Museum and the Greenway that parallels U.S 321.  The Townsend area was once the site of many scenic swinging bridges over Little River; liability concerns have caused most of these to be dismantled in recent years.  One bridge does remain, however, at the northern end of Townsend in an area known as Kinzel Springs. A second swinging bridge is located near the LRRR&LC Museum and connects to Dark Island.

Little River continues to flow north through Miller Cove into the small community of Walland, which is at the current time the eastern terminus of the Chilhowee section of Foothills Parkway, a national parkway.

Walland to Fort Loudon Lake

Beyond Walland, Little River cuts a wide gap in Chilhowee Mountain before descending into the Maryville-Alcoa flatlands.  As it steadies, the river no longer displays the extreme clarity and attractive rocky bottom of its upper reaches and resembles a more typical stream in a moderately rolling, somewhat rural area.  From the old mill dam at the Peery's Mill site north of Walland to the river's mouth at Ft. Loudoun Lake (approximately 19 miles), the river is generally navigable with a canoe, with the exception of a dangerous low-head dam at the Rockford Manufacturing Company in Rockford. Little River flows through farmland, under U.S. Highway 411, and passes through the cities of Maryville and Alcoa before reaching Rockford.

Approximately 85,000 residents of these communities draw drinking water from the river. Three creeks— Pistol Creek, Short Creek and Crooked Creek— join Little River in this area.  These three creeks are considered "impaired", contributing to a designation of Little River as "threatened" by the Tennessee Department of Environment and Conservation.  Little River flows into a surprisingly large (given the size of the stream) embayment of the Fort Loudon Lake impoundment of the Tennessee River along U.S. Highway 129, where a small marina is located. Little River forms the line between Blount County and Knox County for the last few miles of its course.

See also
List of rivers of Tennessee

References

External links

 Little River Watershed Association
 Elkmont

Rivers of Tennessee
Great Smoky Mountains National Park
Rivers of Blount County, Tennessee
Rivers of Sevier County, Tennessee
Rivers of Knox County, Tennessee
Townsend, Tennessee
Tributaries of the Tennessee River